Christiane Weber (born 13 February 1962) is a German fencer. She won gold medals in the team foil events at the 1984 and 1988 Summer Olympics.

Weber is married to Achim Bellmann, who competed in the modern pentathlon at the 1984 Games.

References

1962 births
Living people
German female fencers
Olympic gold medalists for West Germany
Fencers at the 1984 Summer Olympics
Fencers at the 1988 Summer Olympics
Olympic fencers of West Germany
Olympic medalists in fencing
Medalists at the 1984 Summer Olympics
Medalists at the 1988 Summer Olympics
People from Saarlouis (district)
Sportspeople from Saarland